880 Naval Air Squadron was a Royal Navy Fleet Air Arm aircraft carrier-based squadron formed in January 1941. It was disbanded on 11 September 1945 at  Schofields, Sydney, Australia.

The squadron was reformed on 1 May 1951 as a carrier-based anti-submarine squadron in the Royal Canadian Navy. It was redesignated VS 880, in 1952. It ceased operations in April 1990 when its aircraft were retired.

Royal Navy
The squadron was first formed as a fighter squadron of the Fleet Air Arm on 15 January 1941 at RNAS Arbroath in Scotland. It was initially equipped with a mix of aircraft, including Grumman Martlets, Gloster Sea Gladiators and Hawker Sea Hurricane Ias, before settling on the carrier-compatible Sea Hurricane Ib in July that year. On 21 July, a flight of four Hurricanes from the squadron embarked on the carrier  to take part in a raid on the ports of Kirkenes in Norway and Petsamo in Finland. The Hurricanes took part in the attack on Petsamo on 30 July, and on 31 July, one of the flight's Hurricanes shot down a German aircraft shadowing the British force. In October that year, the complete squadron embarked aboard the newly completed carrier , which was allocated to the Far East. In January 1942, 48 crated RAF Hurricanes were loaded aboard Indomitable at Durban, South Africa, for delivery to the East Indies. While these aircraft were accompanied by RAF ground crew, who were intended to ready the Hurricanes for flight, few of the RAF personnel had any experience of working on Hurricanes and the task of assembling the aircraft passed to 880 Squadron, with the Hurricanes being flown off Indomitable on 27 January.

In May 1942, the squadron took part in the invasion of Madagascar, being largely employed in ground attack duties during the capture of Diego-Suarez at the start of the invasion, and destroying one light aircraft by strafing at Arrachart airfield, leaving air superiority duties to the Martlets of 881 and 882 Squadrons operating off . In July 1942, Indomitable, with 880 Squadron aboard, returned to Britain to prepare for Operation Pedestal, a plan to run a convoy carrying vital fuel, supplies and food to besieged Malta. The squadron claimed eight German and Italian aircraft shot down and three more damaged during Pedestal, for a loss of three aircraft, while Indomitable was badly damaged by German bombs on 12 August. Four of the squadron's pilots were killed either in the air or when Indomitable was bombed.

After Indomitables return to Britain later that month, 880 Squadron re-equipped with Supermarine Seafires, joining  in October 1942 as Indomitable was still under repair. In November , the squadron took part in Operation Torch, the Anglo-American invasion of French North-West Africa, operating in support of the landings at Algiers. In March 1943, the squadron re-embarked on Indomitable, with the carrier part of the covering force protecting the Allied invasion of Sicily from any intervention by Italian naval forces in July 1943. Indomitable was damaged during the Sicily operations, and in August, 880 Squadron joined the Escort carrier , helping to provide a Combat Air Patrol over the landings at Salerno, Italy, in September 1943.

In February 1944, the Squadron embarked aboard Furious for operations off Norway, continuing operations off that carrier until September that year, taking part in Operation Tungsten, an attack against the German battleship  on 3 April 1944. In November the squadron embarked aboard , which took part in operations off Norway in November and December that year. In March 1945, the squadron was on board Implacable as the carrier left Britain on passage to join the British Pacific Fleet. In June 1945, 880 Squadron took part in Operation Inmate, an attack on the isolated Japanese base at Truk atoll by Implacable and supporting ships. Implacables Seafires (from 880 and 801 Squadrons) dive-bombed oil tanks and spotted for the cruisers of the task force as they shelled targets on the atoll. In July–August 1945, Implacables air wing, including 880 Squadron, (with the squadron's Seafires now fitted with drop tanks to increase range), took part in strikes against the Japanese home islands. The squadron was disbanded at RAAF Station Schofields, near Sydney, Australia, on 11 September 1945, when it was merged with 801 Squadron.

Canada

The squadron was re-formed as an anti-submarine squadron of the Royal Canadian Navy on 1 May 1951, when, as part of a renumbering of Commonwealth Naval Air Squadrons, 825 Squadron, based at HCMS Shearwater, a Canadian Naval airbase at Dartmouth, Nova Scotia and equipped with Fairey Firefly AS.5s, was renumbered 880 Squadron. The squadron, which regularly deployed aboard the carrier , re-equipped with Grumman TBM-3E Avengers and was renamed VS 880 following the USN naming convention in November 1952. In September 1957, VS 880 first embarked on Canada's new carrier, and the squadron began to re-equip with Grumman CS2F-1 Trackers in October 1957, flying its last flight with the Avenger on 13 December that year. On 7 July 1959, the Tracker-equipped VS 881 merged with VS 880, leaving the enlarged VS 880 with a complement of 24 Trackers and 450 personnel. From January 1960, the squadron received CS2F-2 Trackers, with improved sensors, to replace its CS2F-1s, which were discarded by the end of December that year.

On 1 February 1968, VS 880 joined the newly established Canadian Armed Forces as the Royal Canadian Navy was merged with the Canadian Army and the Royal Canadian Air Force. Bonaventure was decommissioned without replacement on 3 July 1970, with VS 880 carrying out its last flight from the carrier on 12 December. With the demise of Bonaventure, VS 880 was transferred to shore-based inshore anti-submarine operations, with its Trackers receiving the new designation of CP-121 on 27 July 1970. In December 1973, Canada declared a  Exclusive Economic Zone (EEZ), and the squadron's role was changed to protecting the EEZ, which resulted in the squadron being re-designated MR 880, and anti-submarine systems being removed from its Trackers. Duties included fisheries protectionpollution and wildlife surveys and ice patrols over Canada's Arctic coasts, with the aircraft receiving new radar and communications equipment in 1978, and adding the ability to carry CRV7 rockets from 1982. It moved to CFB Summerside on Prince Edward Island in 1981. Late-1980s' plans to upgrade Canada's Trackers with turboprop engines were abandoned, and the fisheries protection role was privatised, leading to the squadron's Trackers being retired in April 1990. The squadron has never been officially disbanded and still exists as a "zero strength" unit.

References

 
 
 
 
 
 
  
 
 
 
 
 

800 series Fleet Air Arm squadrons